Zoo was a Norwegian band mainly active in the late 1970s and early 1980s, though founded in 1966. The band consisted of Ketil Stokkan (guitars, vocals), Sverri Dahl (keyboards, vocals), Erling Andersen (bass guitar, vocals), Rudi Høynes (drums, vocals) and Trond Nyrud (flutes, saxophones). They rose to national success with the singles "Evig Ung" (Forever Young, 1980) and "Vent, Ikkje Legg På" (Wait, Don't Hang Up, 1981). Frontman and songwriter Stokkan later represented Norway twice in the Eurovision Song Contest.

Discography

 1978 – Captured in Zoo
 1979 – Guilty
 1979 – Noregs heitaste
 1980 – Z på maken
 1981 – Gaya
 1982 – Shagalai
 1994 – Zoobra (compilation)
 2000 – Evig ung (compilation)

Norwegian musical groups